Sergio Fabián Zárate Riga (born 14 October 1969) is an Argentine former professional footballer who played as a midfielder. He spent most of his career in the Bundesliga and the Primera División de México apart from his native Argentina.

Club career
Born in Haedo, Morón Partido, Zárate started his career with Vélez Sarsfield where he spent four years in the Argentinian Primera División. He then moved to Europe where he would eventually make 80 appearances in the Bundesliga for 1. FC Nürnberg and Hamburger SV as well as a season in Italy with Ancona. In 1995 Zárate moved to Mexico where he played 190 games for Necaxa, Club América and Puebla during two stints.

International career
Zárate won his only international cap for Argentina in 1992.

Personal life
Sergio is the eldest of five brothers of whom four became professional footballers; Ariel played in Spain for Málaga among other teams, Rolando (also an Argentinian international) and youngest brother Mauro is a U-20 World Cup winner. Sergio works as an agent for his brothers. Sergio's nephew, Tobías, also became a professional footballer.

References

External links
 
 Player article 
 Player article 

1969 births
Club Puebla players
Living people
People from Morón Partido
Argentine footballers
Argentine sportspeople of Chilean descent
Argentine people of Calabrian descent
Argentina international footballers
Association football forwards
Club Atlético Vélez Sarsfield footballers
1. FC Nürnberg players
A.C. Ancona players
Hamburger SV players
Club Necaxa footballers
Club América footballers
Argentine Primera División players
Bundesliga players
Serie A players
Liga MX players
Expatriate footballers in Germany
Expatriate footballers in Italy
Expatriate footballers in Mexico
Argentine expatriate footballers
Argentine expatriate sportspeople in Germany
Argentine expatriate sportspeople in Italy
Argentine expatriate sportspeople in Mexico
Zárate family
Sportspeople from Buenos Aires Province